Jamar Williams (born June 14, 1984) is a former gridiron football linebacker. Williams played at Arizona State University. Originally from Houston, TX, he attended Langham Creek High School.  He graduated as a member of the 4-year National Honor Roll.  Williams was drafted in the 4th round by the Chicago Bears. On April 27, 2010, Jamar Williams was traded to the Carolina Panthers for safety Chris Harris.

Professional career

NFL

Williams was drafted by the Chicago Bears in the 2006 NFL Draft in the 4th round. In 4 seasons with the Bears he amassed 89 tackles and 1 quarterback sack. He was then traded to the Carolina Panthers for the 2010 NFL season. Following the 2010 season he was released by the Panthers.

CFL

On March 8, 2012, Williams signed with the Saskatchewan Roughriders of the Canadian Football League.

References

External links
Official Web site

1984 births
Living people
American football linebackers
Arizona State Sun Devils football players
Chicago Bears players
Carolina Panthers players
Saskatchewan Roughriders players